Cass Township is one of nine townships in Sullivan County, Indiana, USA.  As of the 2010 census, its population was 2,074 and it contained 975 housing units.

Geography

Cities, towns, villages
 Dugger

Unincorporated towns
 Baker at 
 Cass at 
 Gambill at 
 Greenville at 
 Hawton at 
 Jericho at 
 Scotchtown at 
 Shiloh at 
 Stringtown at 
(This list is based on USGS data and may include former settlements.)

Extinct towns
 Caledonia at 
 Farnsworth at 
(These towns are listed as "historical" by the USGS.)

Adjacent townships
 Jackson Township (north)
 Wright Township, Greene County (east)
 Stockton Township, Greene County (southeast)
 Jefferson Township (south)
 Haddon Township (southwest)
 Hamilton Township (west)

Cemeteries
The township contains these five cemeteries: Burris, Clayton Cemeteries (historical), Deckard, Dugger and Houck.

Major highways
  Indiana State Road 54

Lakes
 Greenbriar Lake

School districts
 Northeast School Corporation

Political districts
 Indiana's 8th congressional district
 State House District 45
 State Senate District 39

References
 United States Census Bureau 2008 TIGER/Line Shapefiles
 United States Board on Geographic Names (GNIS)
 IndianaMap

External links
 Indiana Township Association
 United Township Association of Indiana

Townships in Sullivan County, Indiana
Terre Haute metropolitan area
Townships in Indiana